Love is a studio album by Amen Dunes.

Track listing

Chart positions

Release history

References

2014 albums
Amen Dunes albums